Two Australian ferries have the name MV Queenscliff:

 , a Freshwater-class ferry operating in Sydney
 , a modern roll-on/roll-off ferry operating in Victoria

Ship names